The Bristol Reservoirs are six reservoirs or sets of reservoirs in the area south of Bristol. All six are operated by Bristol Water.

They are (in decreasing order of size):
 Chew Valley Lake
 Blagdon Lake
 Cheddar Reservoir
 Barrow Gurney Reservoirs
 Litton Reservoirs
 Chew Magna Reservoir

All this is done by gravity as it collects and conveys water from the Chewton Mendip and East and West Harptree areas.

References 

Reservoirs in Somerset
Drinking water reservoirs in England
Protected areas of Bristol